Pokémon Adventures, known in Japan as , is a Japanese manga series published by Shogakukan. The story arcs of the series are based on most of the Pokémon video games released by Nintendo and, as such, the main characters of the series have the name of their video game. Since the manga is based on the video games, there are some delays with the serialization since the authors need to have seen the games in order to continue with the plot.

The series is written by Hidenori Kusaka, it is illustrated by Mato during the first nine volumes, while Satoshi Yamamoto starts illustrating it since the tenth volume. The Japanese publisher Shogakukan has been releasing the individual chapters in tankōbon format with the first one being released on August 8, 1997. This page includes information on volumes 41–60, published between 2012 and the present day. 

The distributing company Viz Media has licensed the series for English in the United States. Viz released the first seven volumes of the series in tankōbon format from July 6, 2000 to January 2003 as well as in magazine format. During 2006 they released two volumes with the name of The Best of Pokémon Adventures which are various chapters from the first two arcs put into one book. On June 1, 2009, Viz restarted publishing the tankōbon volumes, publishing every arc past the originals. Volumes 41-61 cover all arcs from HeartGold/SoulSilver to X/Y.

Volume list

Volumes 41–current
HeartGold & SoulSilver chapter

Black & White chapter

Black 2 & White 2 chapter

X & Y chapter

Chapters not yet in tankōbon format
22 rounds in Omega Ruby & Alpha Sapphire chapter, 37 rounds in Sun, Moon, Ultra Sun & Ultra Moon chapter and 19 rounds in Sword & Shield chapter are yet to be published in a tankōbon volume, but have been printed in the magazine, mini volumes, or published online. These titles, and their order, are subject to change, both in collection into tankōbon, and translation into English.

 Omega Ruby & Alpha Sapphire chapter 
Published online.

 Sun, Moon, Ultra Sun & Ultra Moon chapter 
Published in CoroCoro Ichiban! magazine and online.

 Sword & Shield chapter 
Published in CoroCoro Ichiban! magazine and online.

Mini-Volumes 
Due to several hiatuses in the development of the Black 2/White 2 arc (beginning in 2013 and not concluding until 2020), publication of the tankōbon volumes went on a hiatus. In response, Viz released mini-volumes of the arcs from X/Y onwards. These were half the length (ranging from 2-4 chapters compared to 6-12 chapters in the tankōbons) and released more frequently. 12 mini-volumes were released for the X/Y, Sun/Moon, and Sword/Shield arcs, and 6 mini-volumes of the Omega Ruby/Alpha Sapphire arc were released as well. tankōbon volumes of the X/Y arc would be published in America in early 2022.

References

External links
 Official Pokémon Adventures website of Viz Media
 Official Pokémon Adventures website 

Adventures (41-current)